PSNI Football Club is an intermediate Northern Irish football club that plays in the NIFL Premier Intermediate League. The club is associated with the Police Service of Northern Ireland, and its home ground is Newforge Lane in Belfast.

History
PSNI FC was founded in 1928 as RUC (Royal Ulster Constabulary) and changed its name in 2002, following the NI police service's name change.

The club joined the Northern Amateur Football League in 1956 and became one of its leading clubs before being elevated to the Irish League B Division in 1975. The club stayed at this level until failing to gain a place in the reorganised and re-branded IFA Championship in 2008.

Although originally only serving members of the Police Service of Northern Ireland could play for the team, that rule no longer exists.

In February, 2019, Will Horwood was appointed as the PSNI FC manager. 6 months later, in early November, 2019, Will decided to appoint 20 year old Rhys Hadden as the assistant manager.

In January, 2020, Glenn Taggart was appointed manager of PSNI FC.

Current squad

Honours

Intermediate honours
Irish League B Division: 1
1986–87
Irish Intermediate Cup: 4
1978–79, 1979–80, 1984–85, 1986–87
Steel & Sons Cup: 1
1993–94
B Division Knock-out Cup: 3
1982–83, 1984–85, 1985–86
Northern Amateur Football League: 2
1970–71, 1972–73
Clarence Cup: 1
1960–61
Border Cup: 1
1964-65

Junior honours
County Antrim Junior Shield: 1
1965–66†

† Won by RUC II (reserve team)

External links
Official website

References

Association football clubs in Northern Ireland
Police Service of Northern Ireland
Association football clubs established in 1928
NIFL Championship clubs
Association football clubs in Belfast
1928 establishments in Northern Ireland
Police association football clubs in Northern Ireland